Trichrous fisheri is a species of beetle in the family Cerambycidae. It was described by Monné and Giesbert in 1992.

References

Heteropsini
Beetles described in 1992